Parliamentary elections will be held in Albania by 2025.

Background 
In the 2021 parliamentary elections, the Socialist Party won 74 of the 140 seats in the parliament, resulting in Edi Rama being re-elected as Prime Minister. The PD-AN alliance, led by the centre-right Democrats, increased their seat-share from 43 seats to 59. However of the 59 seats 9 went to smaller parties that ran within the Democratic party.

Electoral system 
The 140 members of Parliament are elected in twelve multi-member constituencies based on the twelve counties by open list using proportional representation (using a 1% national electoral threshold) with seats allocated using the d'Hondt method.

Opinion polls

Leadership approval

Edi Rama

The polls below asked voters for their opinion of Edi Rama, leader of the Socialist Party and Prime Minister of Albania since september 2013.

Sali Berisha

The polls below asked voters for their opinion of Sali Berisha, de-facto leader of the Democratic Party , former Prime Minister of Albania and former President of Albania .

Ilir Meta

The polls below asked voters for their opinion of Ilir Meta, leader of the  Freedom Party , former President of Albania .

Enkelejd Alibeaj

The polls below asked voters for their opinion of Enkelejd Alibeaj, an MP contesting for leadership of the Democratic Party , former Minister of Justice.

Notes

References

2025
Albania